The 1990 Athens Trophy was a women's tennis tournament played on outdoor clay courts in Athens, Greece that was part of Tier V of the 1990 WTA Tour. It was the fifth edition of the tournament and was held from 10 September through 16 September 1990. Fourth-seeded Cecilia Dahlman won the singles title and earned $13, 500 first-prize money.

Finals

Singles

 Cecilia Dahlman defeated  Katia Piccolini 7–5, 7–5
 It was Dahlman's only singles title of the year and the 2nd of her career.

Doubles

 Laura Garrone /  Karin Kschwendt defeated  Leona Lásková /  Jana Pospíšilová 6–0, 1–6, 7–6(8–6)
 It was Garrone's 2nd title of the year and the 3rd of her career. It was Kschwendt's 2nd title of the year and the 2nd of her career.

See also
 1990 Athens Open – men's tournament

References

External links
 ITF tournament edition details
 Tournament draws

Athens Trophy
Athens Trophy
Athens Trophy